Fuensanta Nieto de la Cierva (born 18 April 1957) is a Spanish architect. She is known for her work as a partner of Nieto Sobejano Arquitectos, a firm which she co-founded in 1984.

Fuensanta Nieto studied at the Higher Technical School of Architecture of Madrid.
From 1986 to 1991 she was co-director of the architectural journal ARQUITECTURA, published by the Colegio Oficial de Arquitectos de Madrid.

She is a recipient of the Alvar Aalto Medal, the firm Nieto Sobejano having been given this award in 2015.

Works

Nieto has been involved in a number of museum and exhibition projects in Spain and other countries. These include a museum constructed in 2005-8 for Medina Azahara, an archaeological site near Córdoba. The building was designed so as not to impose itself on the landscape of Medina Azahara (which has since been declared a World Heritage Site).
A project in Estonia, the Arvo Pärt Centre, is also integrated into the landscape. This building, an archive for the composer Arvo Pärt, was shortlisted for the Mies van der Rohe Award 2019.

References

1957 births
Living people
Architects from Madrid
21st-century Spanish architects
Spanish women architects